Alberta Provincial Highway No. 57, commonly referred to as Highway 57, was a highway in central Alberta, Canada that served the Town of Drayton Valley and existed between the 1950s and 1979.  It is now part of Highway 22 and Highway 39.

History 
Highway 57 originally was a north–south gravel highway that linked Drayton Valley to Highway 16 in Entwistle. In the mid-1950s, spurred on by increased oil activity, Highway 57 was extended from Drayton Valley eastward across the North Saskatchewan River. In 1955, a ferry that started operations and travelled east to the Village of Breton, terminating Highway 39. In 1980, the Highway 22 designation was extended north, which included a  section of Highway 57 being renumbered; the remaining  section of Highway 57 became part of Highway 39.

References 

057
057